The 2023 Texas A&M–Commerce Lions football team will represent Texas A&M University–Commerce as a member of the Southland Conference during the 2023 NCAA Division I FCS football season. The Lions will be led by first-year head coach Clint Dolezel and play home games at the Ernest Hawkins Field at Memorial Stadium in Commerce, Texas.

Schedule
Texas A&M–Commerce and the Southland Conference announced the 2023 football schedule on December 14, 2022.

References

Texas A&M–Commerce Lions
Texas A&M–Commerce Lions football seasons
Texas A&M–Commerce Lions football